"Like an Animal" is the first single by the Glove from their album Blue Sunshine, released in 1983 by Wonderland Records/Polydor. The Glove were a side project for Robert Smith of the Cure and Steven Severin of Siouxsie and the Banshees. The song was recorded in 1983 while Smith was also a member of the Banshees. The vocals on the song are provided by Jeanette Landray, a dancer and friend of members of the Banshees.

The lyrics were written by Smith and tell the true story of a woman who went mad while living in a US tower block.

The release of the single went largely unnoticed  at the time, because both the Cure and the Banshees had recently released their most successful singles to date.

Reception
In a review of the 2006 reissue of the Blue Sunshine album, which included the "Like an Animal (Club? What Club?)" remix of the song, PopMatters editor Adam Besenyodi said that the remix "remains largely unessential".

Track listing

7"
 "Like an Animal" (4:44)
 "Mouth to Mouth" (5:35)

12"
 "Like an Animal (Club? What Club?)" (6:36)
 "Like an Animal" (4:44)
 "Mouth to Mouth" (5:35)

Personnel
 Steven Severin: bass
 Robert Smith: guitar
 Jeanette Landray: vocals
 Martin McCarrick: keyboards, strings
 Ginny Hewes: strings
 Anne Stephenson: strings
 Andy Anderson: drums

References

1983 songs
1983 debut singles
The Glove songs
Songs written by Robert Smith (musician)
Songs written by Steven Severin